Leninabad may refer to:

Azerbaijan 
Kərimbəyli, Babek
Sanqalan
Təklə, Gobustan
Yeni yol, Shamkir

Tajikistan 
Khujand
Sughd Province